Theia is a hypothesized ancient planet in the early Solar System that, according to the giant-impact hypothesis, collided with the early Earth around 4.5 billion years ago, with some of the resulting ejected debris gathering to form the Moon. 
Theia could explain why Earth's core is larger than expected for a body its size, with Theia's core and mantle fusing with those of Earth.
Theia is hypothesized to have been about the size of Mars. Theia may have formed in the outer Solar System and provided much of Earth's water.

Name
Theia was named after Theia, one of the Titans, who in Greek mythology was the mother of Selene, the goddess of the Moon, which parallels the planet Theia's collision with the early Earth that is theorized to have created the Moon. In modern Greek, it has the same origin as the words "θείος" (theios) and "θεία" (theia) ('uncle' and 'aunt', also meaning 'divine' in Ancient Greek).

Orbit
Theia is hypothesized to have orbited in the L4 or L5 configuration presented by the Earth–Sun system, where it would tend to remain. Gravitational perturbations by Venus could have eventually put it onto a collision course with the early Earth.

Collision

According to the giant impact hypothesis, Theia orbited the Sun, nearly along the orbit of the proto-Earth, by staying close to one or the other of the Sun-Earth system's two more stable Lagrangian points (i.e., either L4 or L5). Theia was eventually perturbed away from that relationship by the gravitational influence of Jupiter, Venus, or both, resulting in a collision between Theia and Earth.

Computer simulations suggest that Theia was traveling no faster than  when it struck Earth at an estimated 45-degree angle.

Initially, the hypothesis supposed that Theia had struck Earth with a glancing blow and ejected many pieces of both the proto-Earth and Theia, those pieces either forming one body that became the Moon or forming two moons that eventually merged to form the Moon. Such accounts assumed that a head-on impact would have destroyed both planets, creating a short-lived second asteroid belt between the orbits of Venus and Mars.

In contrast, evidence published in January 2016 suggests that the impact was indeed a head-on collision and that Theia's remains are on Earth and the Moon.

Hypotheses

From the beginning of modern astronomy, there have been at least four hypotheses for the origin of the Moon:
 A single body split into Earth and Moon
 The Moon was captured by Earth's gravity (as most of the outer planets' smaller moons were captured)
 The Earth and Moon formed at the same time when the protoplanetary disk accreted
 The Theia-impact scenario described above

The lunar rock samples retrieved by Apollo astronauts were found to be very similar in composition to Earth's crust, and so were likely removed from Earth in some violent event.

By 2012, Matija Ćuk and Sarah Stewart theorized that Theia could explain why Earth's core is larger than expected for a body its size; Theia's core and mantle could have fused with those of Earth.

Evidence published in 2019 suggests that Theia might have formed in the outer Solar System, and that much of Earth's water originated on Theia.

See also
 Disrupted planet
 Nibiru cataclysm
 Phaeton (hypothetical planet)
 Synestia

References

Lunar science
Hypothetical impact events
Hypothetical bodies of the Solar System
Hypothetical planets
Possible dwarf planets
Water
Space